Donald Norman Cameron (3 November 1851 – 17 February 1931) was an Australian politician. He served in the House of Representatives (1901–1903, 1904–1906) and Tasmanian House of Assembly (1912–1913, 1925–1928).

Early life
Cameron was born in Launceston, Tasmania, the son of Donald Cameron who served in the Tasmanian Legislative Council from 1868 to 1886.

Federal politics
At the 1901 federal election, Cameron was elected for the Free Trade Party as one of Tasmania's five members of the Australian House of Representatives, since Tasmania had not been divided into electoral divisions. At the 1903 election he contested the seat of Denison, but was defeated by the Protectionist candidate, Sir Philip Fysh. He returned to the House when he won a by-election in the seat of Wilmot in 1904. He is remembered today for his part in the choice of national capital. The house was evenly divided, he effectively having the casting vote. After two weeks' prevarication he settled on Canberra.

Prior to the 1906 election, supporters of the Anti-Socialists in Cameron's electorate decided to switch their support to a new candidate, Llewellyn Atkinson, as they believed Atkinson was more popular in the electorate and did not wish to split the vote. However, some newspapers such as The Hobart Mercury still listed him as the endorsed Anti-Socialist candidate in Wilmot. He was defeated by Atkinson and out-polled by the Labor candidate, finishing with 12.1 percent of the vote.

State politics and later life
After losing his federal seat Cameron returned to Tasmanian politics, serving in the House of Assembly from 1912 to 1913 and again from 1925 to 1928.  He died at Chudleigh of pneumonia following a fall. He was survived by his wife, a daughter and two of his three sons.  One son, Donald Keith Cameron, served in the Tasmanian House of Assembly from 1934–37. His brother Cyril Cameron was a Protectionist Party Senator contemporaneously with his service as MHR, 1901–1903 then from 1906–1913.

References

|-

1851 births
1931 deaths
Alumni of the University of St Andrews
Free Trade Party members of the Parliament of Australia
Members of the Australian House of Representatives
Members of the Australian House of Representatives for Tasmania
Members of the Australian House of Representatives for Wilmot
20th-century Australian politicians